V1027 Cygni is a luminous yellow supergiant star located in the constellation of Cygnus, about 14,000 light years away. For a time, it was thought that it could be a low-mass post-AGB star, however recent parallax measurements published in Gaia DR3 have shown this to likely not be the case, and instead it is likely a massive yellow supergiant star.

Properties 
Spectral indicators of luminosity also suggest a supergiant status.

In the TESS Input Catalog (TIC) from 2019 the star's radius was calculated to be .

Variability 
When V1027 Cygni was first noticed as a variable star, it was thought to be an irregular variable, dimming and brightening erratically with no discernible period. However, in 2009, a small-amplitude period of 237 days was observed in long-term photometry of the star.

Notes

References 

G-type supergiants
Irregular variables
Cygnus (constellation)
333385